Plane is a 2023 American action thriller film directed by Jean-François Richet from a screenplay by Charles Cumming and J. P. Davis. The film stars Gerard Butler, Mike Colter, Yoson An, and Tony Goldwyn. The plot centers on a pilot (Butler) allying with a prisoner (Colter) to save his passengers from a hostile territory they landed in for an emergency landing.

The film was announced in 2016, acquired by Lionsgate in 2019, sold to Solstice Studios in 2020, and re-acquired by Lionsgate in 2021. It was shot in Puerto Rico. Plane was released in the United States on January 13, 2023. It received generally favorable reviews from critics and has grossed $51 million worldwide.

Plot 
Commercial pilot Brodie Torrance, a former RAF pilot from Scotland, flies Trailblazer Airlines Flight 119 with 14 passengers and three cabin crew members from Singapore to Honolulu via Tokyo. Among the passengers is fugitive homicide suspect Louis Gaspare, who is accompanied by an RCMP officer en route to Canada. Taking advice from one of his superiors, Brodie takes a shortcut across the South China Sea, but the plane is heavily damaged by a storm and a flight attendant and the RCMP officer are killed during the turbulence. The plane makes an emergency landing on what turns out to be Jolo island in the Philippines.

In New York City, the board of Trailblazer calls Scarsdale, their crisis manager. He dispatches a private military outfit to rescue the passengers, as the authorities are unwilling to send troops into the rebel-controlled island. Brodie goes off into the jungle for help, accompanied by Louis. At an abandoned warehouse, Brodie phones his superiors and daughter to tell their location, but is attacked by a rebel whom he subdues. They encounter a site used by the rebels to make ransom videos and race back to the plane, but are beaten to it by rebel leader Datu Junmar, who kills a Korean couple who try to escape and takes the surviving passengers and crew hostage, intending to secure large ransoms from their families.

After the group leaves, Brodie and Louis overpower remaining rebels and force them to reveal the location of their lair. Before leaving, Brodie leaves a note to inform rescue teams of the situation. At the rebel hideout, Brodie and Louis kill the guards and sneak the passengers and crew onto a bus. Brodie decides to stay behind to distract the rebels. As he is about to be executed, the rescue team arrives, inflicting heavy casualties on Junmar's men. 

Back at the plane, Brodie and his copilot Samuel Dele manage to fire up the plane and gather everyone inside for takeoff. Scarsdale's group sets up a Barrett M82 counter-materiele rifle for increased firepower and together with Louis fight off Junmar's men. Louis chooses to stay behind to distract Junmar's forces and allow Scarsdale's team to board the plane, preventing an attempt by Junmar to blow up the plane with an RPG and later fleeing into the jungle with a bag of ransom money brought by the mercenaries. Despite being shot in the leg during the shootout, Brodie crushes Junmar under the plane's wheels during takeoff. 

The plane is too damaged and too low on fuel to make a long journey, but Brodie manages to land the plane at the neighboring island of Siasi. As the passengers and crew are tended to by the island's rescue team, Brodie phones his daughter, telling her he is coming home.

Cast

 Gerard Butler as Brodie Torrance, a commercial pilot
 Mike Colter as Louis Gaspare, a former GCP French Foreign Legion passenger being extradited to Toronto, Canada on charges of homicide
 Tony Goldwyn as Scarsdale, a former Special Forces officer who leads the rescue effort
 Yoson An as Samuel Dele, Torrance's co-pilot
 Evan Dane Taylor as Datu Junmar, a local warlord and terrorist leader on Jolo 
 Paul Ben-Victor as Terry Hampton, the owner of the airline
 Daniella Pineda as Bonnie Lane, the flight purser
 Lilly Krug as Brie Taylor, a passenger with a large following on social media
 Kelly Gale as Katie Dhar, a Swedish passenger, and Brie's friend and companion
 Joey Slotnick as Matt Sinclair, a short-tempered businessman and one of the passengers

Production
On July 13, 2016, MadRiver Pictures acquired The Plane, an original pitch from novelist Charles Cumming, with Marc Butan and Di Bonaventura Pictures' Lorenzo di Bonaventura and Mark Vahradian announced as producers. In October 2019, it was reported that Gerard Butler had joined the cast and would also produce alongside Alan Siegel.

In November 2019, Lionsgate Films acquired distribution rights to the film, but in November 2020, it abandoned the project after failing to obtain production insurance that would cover a COVID-19 outbreak, as the studio did not want to risk the film's original $50 million budget, and Solstice Studios acquired the rights to the film. However, in May 2021, Lionsgate re-acquired the rights to The Plane, in what Andreas Wiseman from Deadline Hollywood described as a "case of high-profile Hollywood volleyball."

In August 2021, Kelly Gale, Mike Colter, Daniella Pineda, Yoson An, Remi Adeleke, Haleigh Hekking, Lilly Krug, Joey Slotnick, and Oliver Trevena joined the cast. Production began that same month in Puerto Rico. Michael Cho, Tim Lee, Gary Raskin, Alastair Burlingame, and Vicki Dee Rock were attached to the film as Executive Producers. On a podcast, Colter said the film was going to focus more on character development than action sequences. On October 11, 2021, it was reported that filming was close to finishing and that Tony Goldwyn and Paul Ben-Victor would also star.

Release
The film was released in theaters in the United States on January 13, 2023, by Lionsgate. It was previously set for release on January 27, 2023.

The film was released to VOD on February 3, 2023. It is set to be released on Blu-ray, DVD and 4K UHD on March 28, 2023.

Reception

Box office 
, Plane has grossed $32.1 million in the United States and Canada, and $19.7 million in other territories, for a worldwide total of $51.8 million.

In the United States and Canada, Plane was released alongside House Party and the wide expansion of A Man Called Otto, and was projected to gross $7–10 million from 3,023 theaters in its opening weekend. The film made $3 million on its first day, including $435,000 from Thursday night previews. It went on to debut to $10.2 million ($11.8 million over the four-day MLK weekend), finishing in fifth. The film made $5.3 million and $3.8 million in its second and third weekends, respectively.

Critical response 
  Audiences polled by CinemaScore gave the film an average grade of "B+" on an A+ to F scale, while those polled by PostTrak gave it an 83% positive score, with 63% saying they would definitely recommend it.

Reaction in the Philippines 
Filipino actor and senator Robin Padilla condemned the film's portrayal of the Philippines, pointing out how the film depicted Jolo as being run by separatists and militia, and the Philippine Army as "cowards". In real life, the Jihadist group Abu Sayyaf established their base of operations in Jolo but were not able to push out the Philippine Government's authority in the island. Their presence has also declined significantly since their peak in the 2000s. Padilla's criticism was supported by fellow senator Ronald dela Rosa and Senate President Juan Miguel Zubiri, who argued the film could damage the country's tourism. Meanwhile, the Directors' Guild of the Philippines opposed the proposed ban, saying that it constitutes as censorship, and argued that the ban could set a precedent on the freedom of artistic expression of any depiction of the country. They also argued that the film was not a reliable commentary on the country's affairs, stating that Plane was just "mindless B-movie entertainment".

In response, the Movie and Television Review and Classification Board (MTRCB) of the Philippines stated that it would re-evaluate the film and launch talks with the film's producers and local distributors. On February 23, Screen Media Films Company, the distributor of the film, voluntarily pulled out the film from "public exhibition" in a letter to the MTRCB, saying that they intend to submit a "new version of the film for appropriate review and classification."

Sequel
In February 2023, it was announced Colter will reprise his role as Louis Gaspare for a sequel titled Ship. Jean-François Richet returns as an executive producer with MadRiver Pictures, Di Bonaventura Pictures, and G-BASE Productions also re-teaming.  While Gerard Butler will not star, he may make a cameo appearance.

References

External links
 

American action thriller films
Di Bonaventura Pictures films
Films about aircraft hijackings
Films about aviation accidents or incidents
Films about aviators
Films about terrorism in Asia
Films directed by Jean-François Richet
Films impacted by the COVID-19 pandemic
Films produced by Lorenzo di Bonaventura
Films scored by Marco Beltrami
Films set around New Year
Films set on airplanes
Films set in Hawaii
Films set in New York City
Films set in the Philippines
Films set in Singapore
Films shot in Puerto Rico
Lionsgate films
Sulu Archipelago
Film controversies in the Philippines